Lillian Wolock Elliott (1930–1994) was an American fiber artist, and textile designer. She is known for her innovative basket craft.

Biography 
Lillian Wolock Elliott was born in 1930 in Detroit, Michigan. She attended Wayne State University (B.A. degree, 1952), and Cranbrook Academy of Art (M.F.A. degree, 1955). After she graduated school, she worked at Ford Motor Company, as a designer from 1955 to 1958.  

In 1960, she moved to California and became active within the California Craft movement, working initially in woven tapestry and fiber arts. Her work changed in the 1970s and expanded to include experiments with textile and printing on textiles. By 1975, she was practicing basketry with unconventional materials, such as cloth, bark, paper, twine, and zippers.

She taught at the University of California, Berkeley, from 1966 to 1971. Her longtime collaborator was artist , who started as her student.

Death and legacy 
Elliott died in 1994 in Berkeley, California. In 1985, Elliott was awarded the designation as one of twenty people, "Living Treasures of California" by the Crocker Art Museum and the Creative Arts League. She was elected as a fellow of American Craft Council in 1992. 

Elliott has work in public museum collections including Smithsonian American Art Museum, the Fine Arts Museums of San Francisco, Rhode Island School of Design Museum, the San Jose Museum of Quilts & Textiles, and the Jewish Museum.

References 

1930 births
1994 deaths
20th-century American women artists
Wayne State University alumni
Cranbrook Academy of Art alumni
University of California, Berkeley faculty
Artists from Berkeley, California
Artists from Detroit
Women basketweavers
American textile designers